Colin David Campbell (born 21 September 1941) is a New Zealand Roman Catholic bishop. He was the bishop of the Roman Catholic Diocese of Dunedin from 2004 to 2018. He was born in Otautau, Southland and educated at St Therese's Convent School in Invercargill (Dominican sisters) and at Marist Brothers' Primary and Marist Brothers' High schools, Invercargill, before training as a priest at Holy Name Seminary, Christchurch, and Holy Cross College, Mosgiel.

He carried out further studies in London and Trier, Germany. He has a B.A. degree from Massey University. Campbell was ordained a priest in Dunedin by Bishop Kavanagh on 27 June 1966. He was assistant priest at St. Joseph's Cathedral, Dunedin and at Tainui in 1967, in Mornington 1970–72, back at the cathedral in 1972, in Invercargill 1973–1977, and in Georgetown 1977–79. He was parish priest at Bluff (1979–86), at the cathedral (1986-92), at Green Island (1992–95), at Waikiwi (1995-2000) and rector at Holy Cross Seminary, Auckland (2001–04). He was ordained bishop for the Dunedin diocese by his predecessor, Leonard Anthony Boyle, at Dunedin's Town Hall on 9 July 2004.

Campbell's resignation as Bishop of Dunedin was accepted by Pope Francis on 22 February 2018 and his successor, Michael Dooley, was appointed on the same day.

External links
 The Catholic Diocese of Dunedin website, Bishop of Dunedin Most Reverend Colin David Campbell DD  (Retrieved 18 January 2011)
  Bishop Colin David Campbell, Catholic Hierarchy website'' (Retrieved 18 January 2011)

References

1941 births
Living people
21st-century Roman Catholic bishops in New Zealand
People from Otautau
Roman Catholic bishops of Dunedin
Holy Name Seminary alumni
Holy Cross College, New Zealand alumni
Massey University alumni
People educated at Verdon College